Jiří Kuchler (born April 8, 1977) is a Czech former professional ice hockey player. 

Kuchler played 536 games with Rytíři Kladno in the Czech Extraliga, from 1994 to 1999 and from 2005 to 2014.

References

External links

1977 births
Living people
HC Berounští Medvědi players
Czech ice hockey forwards
HK Dukla Trenčín players
BK Havlíčkův Brod players
ŠHK 37 Piešťany players
Rytíři Kladno players
SK Horácká Slavia Třebíč players
HC Slovan Ústečtí Lvi players
Sportovní Klub Kadaň players
1. EV Weiden players
Czech expatriate ice hockey players in Germany
Czech expatriate ice hockey players in Slovakia